Attack Squadron 36 (VA-36), nicknamed the Roadrunners, was an Attack Squadron of the U.S. Navy. The squadron was established on 6 March 1987 at NAS Oceana, Virginia, where it was based during its entire life. It flew the A-6E Intruder until it was disestablished on 1 April 1994. It was the second squadron to be designated VA-36, the first VA-36 was disestablished on 1 August 1970.

Operational history

30 Dec 1988: VA-36 deployed aboard  for the carrier’s maiden cruise to the Mediterranean Sea.
20 Jan–28 Feb 1991: The squadron participated in Operation Desert Storm, combat operations against Iraq.
Apr–Jun 1991: The squadron participated in Operation Provide Comfort, a multi-national operation providing relief and aid for Kurdish refugees in northern Iraq.
Mar–Sep 1993: The squadron, along with other units of CVW-8, deployed aboard USS Theodore Roosevelt in a new approach to joint operations to test the Navy’s ability to project a wide range of power and mobility from the sea. The composition on the carrier during the deployment included the regular air wing, minus an F-14 and S-3 squadron, and a Special Marine Air-Ground Task Force consisting of a Marine Corps fixedwing and helicopter squadron and a company of Marines. The mix of units provided the carrier with the ability to project air and ground striking power ashore from a single deck.
Jun 1993: The squadron, along with other units embarked on USS Theodore Roosevelt, operated in the Red Sea in support of a strike on the Iraqi Intelligence Service headquarters building in Baghdad in response to Iraq’s attempt on the life of former President George H. W. Bush while on a visit to Kuwait in April. During this time, the squadron also participated in Operation Southern Watch missions, enforcing the U. N. no-fly zone within southern Iraq.

See also
 VA-36 (U.S. Navy)
 History of the United States Navy
 List of inactive United States Navy aircraft squadrons

References

Attack squadrons of the United States Navy
Wikipedia articles incorporating text from the Dictionary of American Naval Aviation Squadrons
Military units and formations disestablished in 1994